It's Easy to Talk EP is an independently released EP by American singer-songwriter Willy Mason, which was released in the USA in 2007.

Track listing
Just a Passing Phase
Easy to Talk
The Wind Blows
The Beast
Raise This Roof

2007 albums
Willy Mason albums